Gabre Heard or Gebre Heard, (né Gebregziabher Alemseged Abraha, nom de guerre "Butcher of Mogadishu"),  was a General in the Ethiopian National Defense Force, top party official of the Tigray People's Liberation Front, and the supreme commander of Ethiopian military forces in Somalia.

General Gabre has been criticized for the Ethiopian military's indiscriminate use of heavy weapons in civilian areas, and the use of these weapons in retribution attacks on areas where insurgent forces are suspected to be operating, following attacks on Ethiopian forces. He had little to do with the Transitional Federal Government (TFG), based in Baidoa, dealing mostly with his close allies in government, who included Mogadishu mayor and ex-ARPCT warlord Mohamed Omar Habeb, Mogadishu Police Chief and ex-ARPCT warlord Abdi Hasan Awale Qeybdiid, and the TFG security agency head Mohamed Warsame Darwish.

On 12 August of that year, General Gabre and an unnamed colonel were relieved of command and recalled to Ethiopia, in part for his failure to maintain order in Somalia, but also due to suspected killing and displacement of thousands of Somali civilians by his forces, and rumors of being involved in various financial scandals, which including blackmailing the Somali president, prime minister and various Somali businessmen. Many of Gabre Heard's critics have given him the nom de guerre "Butcher of Mogadishu."

References 

Ethiopian generals
Living people
Year of birth missing (living people)